The 1997–98 Arizona Wildcats men's basketball team represented the University of Arizona in the 1997–98 NCAA Division I men's basketball season. The head coach was Lute Olson. The team played its home games in the McKale Center in Tucson, Arizona, and was a member of the Pacific-10 Conference.  The Wildcats finished the season in first place in the Pacific-10 conference with a 17–1 record.  Arizona reached the Elite Eight in the 1998 NCAA Division I men's basketball tournament, losing to Utah 51-76 and finishing the season with a 30-5 record.

Roster

Schedule and results 

|-
!colspan=9 style="background:#; color:white;"| Regular season

|-
!colspan=9 style="background:#;"| NCAA tournament

|-

NCAA Division I tournament 

 West
 Arizona (#1 seed) 99, Nicholls State 60
 Arizona 82, Illinois State 49
 Arizona 87, Maryland 79
 Utah 76, Arizona 51

Rankings

1998 NBA draft

References 

Arizona Wildcats men's basketball seasons
Arizona Wildcats
Arizona
Arizona Wildcats
Arizona Wildcats